Josephine Bernadette McAliskey (née Devlin; born 23 April 1947), usually known as Bernadette Devlin or Bernadette McAliskey, is an Irish civil rights leader, and former politician. She served as Member of Parliament (MP) for Mid Ulster in Northern Ireland from 1969 to 1974.

Political beginnings

Devlin was born in Cookstown, County Tyrone, to a Catholic family, where she was the third eldest of six children born to John James and Elizabeth Bernadette Devlin. Her father raised her to hold Irish Republican ideals before he died when Bernadette was nine years old. Subsequently, the family had to depend on welfare to survive, an experience which affected Bernadette deeply. Bernadette's mother died when Bernadette was nineteen years old, leaving her to partially raise her siblings while also attending university.

She attended St Patrick's Girls Academy in Dungannon. She was studying psychology at Queen's University Belfast in 1968 when she took a prominent role in a student-led civil rights organisation, People's Democracy. Devlin was subsequently excluded from the university.

She stood unsuccessfully against James Chichester-Clark in the 1969 Northern Ireland general election. When George Forrest, the MP for Mid Ulster, died, she fought the subsequent by-election on the "Unity" ticket, defeating the Ulster Unionist Party candidate, Forrest's widow Anna, and was elected to the Westminster Parliament. Aged 21, she was the youngest MP at the time, and remained the youngest woman ever elected to Westminster until the May 2015 general election when 20-year-old Mhairi Black eclipsed Devlin's achievement.

Devlin stood on the slogan "I will take my seat and fight for your rights" – signalling her rejection of the traditional Irish republican principle of abstentionism. On 22 April 1969, the day before her 22nd birthday, she swore the Oath of Allegiance and made her maiden speech within an hour.

The Troubles

Battle of the Bogside

After engaging, on the side of the residents, in the Battle of the Bogside in August, she was convicted of incitement to riot in December 1969, for which she served a short jail term. After being re-elected at the 1970 general election, Devlin declared that she would sit in Parliament as an independent socialist.

U.S. Tour
Almost immediately after the Battle of the Bogside, Devlin undertook a tour of the United States in August 1969, a trip which generated a significant amount of media attention. She met with members of the Black Panther Party in Watts, Los Angeles and gave them her support. She also made an appearance on The Johnny Carson Show. At a number of speaking events, she made parallels between the struggle in the U.S. by African-Americans seeking civil rights and Catholics in Northern Ireland, sometimes to the embarrassment of her audience. During an event in Philadelphia, she had to goad an African-American singer to sing "We Shall Overcome" to the Irish-American audience, many of whom refused to stand for the song. In Detroit, she refused to take the stage until African-Americans, who were barred from the event, were allowed in. In New York, Mayor John Lindsay arranged a ceremony to present Devlin with a key to the city of New York. Devlin, frustrated with conservative elements of the Irish-American community, left the tour to return to Northern Ireland and, believing the freedom of New York should go to the American poor, sent Eamonn McCann to present the key on her behalf to a representative from the Harlem chapter of the Black Panther Party.

Bloody Sunday
Having witnessed the Bloody Sunday massacre in Derry in 1972, Devlin was infuriated that she was later consistently denied the floor in the House of Commons by the Speaker Selwyn Lloyd, despite the fact that parliamentary convention decreed that any Member of Parliament witnessing an incident under discussion would be granted an opportunity to speak about it therein.

The day following Bloody Sunday, Devlin slapped Conservative Home Secretary Reginald Maudling across the face when he incorrectly asserted in the House of Commons that the Parachute Regiment had fired in self-defence on Bloody Sunday.

Thirteen years later, former British Prime Minister Edward Heath recalled the event: "I remember very well when an hon. Lady rushed from the Opposition Benches and hit Mr. Maudling. I remember that vividly because I thought that she was going to hit me. She could not stretch as far as that, so she had to make do with him."

Devlin appeared on Firing Line in 1972 to discuss the situation in Northern Ireland.

Irish Republican Socialist Party
Devlin helped to form the Irish Republican Socialist Party (IRSP) with Seamus Costello in 1974. This was a revolutionary socialist breakaway from Official Sinn Féin and, on the afternoon after the morning the party was established, Costello also created the Irish National Liberation Army (INLA) as a split from the Official Irish Republican Army. Devlin did not join the INLA and while she served on the party's national executive in 1975, she resigned when a proposal that the INLA become subordinate to the party executive was defeated. In 1977, she joined the Independent Socialist Party, but it disbanded the following year.

Support for prisoners
Devlin stood as an independent candidate in support of the prisoners on the blanket protest and dirty protest at Long Kesh prison in the 1979 elections to the European Parliament in the Northern Ireland constituency, and won 5.9% of the vote. She was a leading spokesperson for the Smash H-Block Campaign, which supported the hunger strikes in 1980 and 1981.

Attempted assassination
On 16 January 1981, Devlin and her husband were shot by members of the Ulster Freedom Fighters, a cover name of the Ulster Defence Association (UDA), who broke into their home near Coalisland, County Tyrone. The gunmen shot Devlin nine times in front of her children.

British soldiers were watching the McAliskey home at the time, but they failed to prevent the assassination attempt. Allegations were subsequently made that elements of the security forces had colluded with the UDA in planning the botched assassination. An army patrol from 3 Para entered the house before waiting outside for half an hour. Devlin has claimed that the patrol "were there to make sure that the gunmen got into my house and that they were caught on the way out." Soldiers from the Argyll and Sutherland Highlanders (ASH) then arrived and transported her by helicopter to a nearby hospital.

The paramilitaries had torn out the telephone and, while the wounded couple were being given first aid by the newly arrived troops, an ASH soldier ran to a neighbour's house, commandeered a car, and drove to the home of a councillor to telephone for help. The couple were taken by helicopter to hospital in nearby Dungannon for emergency treatment and then to the Musgrave Park Hospital, Military Wing, in Belfast, under intensive care.

The attackers—Ray Smallwoods, Tom Graham (38), both from Lisburn, and Andrew Watson (25) from Seymour Hill, Dunmurry—were captured by the army patrol and subsequently jailed. All three were members of the South Belfast UDA. Smallwoods was the driver of the getaway car.

Dáil Éireann elections
She twice failed, in February and November 1982, in attempts to be elected to the Dublin North-Central constituency of the Irish parliament, Dáil Éireann.

Denied entry into the US
In 2003 she was barred from entering the United States and deported on the grounds that the United States Department of State had declared her to pose "a serious threat to the security of the United States" – apparently referring to her conviction for incitement to riot in 1969 – although she protested that she had no terrorist involvement and had frequently been permitted to travel to the United States in the past.

South Tyrone Empowerment Programme 
McAliskey is chief executive of the South Tyrone Empowerment Programme (STEP) and was involved in its founding in 1997. STEP provides a range of services and advocacy in areas including community development, training, support and advice for migrants, policy work, and community enterprise.

Funeral of Dominic McGlinchey
In 1994, McAliskey attended the funeral of former Irish National Liberation Army Chief of Staff Dominic McGlinchey. The INLA had been the armed wing of the Irish Republican Socialist Party, which McAliskey had helped found. McAliskey kissed the coffin, which was carried by her, Sean McGlinchey, Dominic junior and Father O'Daly, who had given McGlinchey the last rites on Hardman's Gardens. During the funeral oration, she condemned the recent press coverage which had accused McGlinchey of drug dealing and criminality and said of the journalists responsible that they were "curs and dogs. May every one of them rot in hell. They have taken away Dominic McGlinchy's character and they will stand judgement for it. He was the finest Republican of them all. He never dishonoured the cause he believed in. His war was with the armed soldiers and the police of this state".

Following this speech, some of the mourners turned on the observing press corps and shouted abuse, reported The Times. A couple of months after the funeral, McAliskey later explained her thinking to The Guardian. Their reporter, David Sharrock, asked if her tirade had been intended to counteract the negative stories about McGlinchey that had recently appeared in the press. McAliskey said "It's very difficult to conduct a conversation about a person who bore no resemblance in the media to the person I knew for 10 years. His thinking was just fundamentally democratic and to acknowledge that Dominic McGlinchey had an intellect was to acknowledge the reality of this conflict here. Republicanism is not simply anti-partitionist and confined to Ireland. It is a tradition of secular egalitarian democracy. So yes. Dominic was the finest republican of his generation. The rest of it I might take back...I don't even believe in hell."

Personal life
In 1971, she gave birth to a daughter, Róisín, which cost her some political support. She married Michael McAliskey on her 26th birthday on 23 April 1973.

On 12 May 2007, she was a guest speaker at the socialist republican political party Éirígí's first Annual James Connolly commemoration in Arbour Hill, Dublin. She works with migrant workers to improve their treatment in Northern Ireland.

In popular culture

In 1969, director and producer John Goldschmidt made the documentary film Bernadette Devlin for ATV, which was shown on the British television channel ITV and on the American television channel CBS's 60 Minutes programme, and included footage of Devlin during the Battle of the Bogside. She was also interviewed at length by Marcel Ophüls in A Sense of Loss (1972). Another documentary, Bernadette: Notes on a Political Journey, directed by Irish programme-maker Leila Doolan, was released in 2011. At the 2008 Cannes Film Festival a biographical film of Devlin was announced, but she stated that "the whole concept is abhorrent to me" and the film was not made.

In the 2002 film Bloody Sunday, Bernadette is played by actress Mary Moulds.

McAliskey, and her assault on the British Home Secretary, Reginald Maudling, after the Bloody Sunday massacre, were the subject of the title song of the 1990 music album, Slap! by anarchist pop/punk band Chumbawamba.

References

External links
Podcast Interview with Bernadette Devlin McAliskey. The Blindboy Podcast. 2018
Public Lecture by Bernadette Devlin McAliskey. 'A Terrible State of Chassis', Derry, 2016 (51 min. video), Field Day, 30 September 2016.
 McAliskey, Bernadette Devlin. The Price of My Soul (Foreword and Chapter Twelve), cain.ulst.ac.uk; accessed 8 August 2015.
 McIntyre, Anthony. "Knowing Too Much and Saying It Too Well: Bernadette McAliskey Barred from US", lark.phoblacht.net, 23 February 2003; accessed 8 August 2015.
 Interview with Peter Stanford, Independent.co.uk, 29 July 2007.

1947 births
Alumni of Queen's University Belfast
Articles containing video clips
Female members of the Parliament of the United Kingdom for Northern Irish constituencies
Independent members of the House of Commons of the United Kingdom
Independent politicians in Northern Ireland
Irish anti-capitalists
Irish Republican Socialist Party politicians
Irish republicans
Living people
Members of the Parliament of the United Kingdom for Mid Ulster
Northern Ireland politicians convicted of crimes
People deported from the United States
People from Cookstown
Republicans imprisoned during the Northern Ireland conflict
Shooting survivors
Socialists from Northern Ireland
UK MPs 1966–1970
UK MPs 1970–1974
20th-century women politicians from Northern Ireland